The former Eastern Uusimaa Region in Finland was divided into two sub-regions, divided further into seven municipalities.

See also 
Southern Finland
Regions of Southern Finland